Ayumi Hamasaki's COUNTDOWN LIVE 2001-2002 A was released in the Complete Live Box DVD.

Track listing
 M (Performed live but not included on the DVD)
 opening Run
 Connected
 UNITE!
 SURREAL
 A Song for XX (Performed live but not included on DVD)
 NEVER EVER
 Fly high
 Boys & Girls
 evolution
 A Song is born
 Daybreak (Performed live but not included on DVD)
 AUDIENCE
 Dearest

---ENCORE---
 Trauma (Performed live but not included on DVD)
 flower garden (Performed live but not included on DVD)
 Endless sorrow 〜gone with the wind ver.〜

Ayumi Hamasaki video albums
2003 video albums
Live video albums
2003 live albums
Albums recorded at the Yoyogi National Gymnasium